The European Parliament election of 1989 took place on 18 June 1989.

Christian Democracy was the largest party in Sardinia. Mario Melis (Sardinian Action Party) was re-elected to the European Parliament in the Islands constituency, thanks to an alliance with several regionalist parties notably including the Valdostan Union.

Results

Source: Ministry of the Interior

Elections in Sardinia
1989 elections in Italy
European Parliament elections in Italy
1989 European Parliament election